Cumayeri is a town in Düzce Province in the Black Sea region of  Turkey. It is the seat of Cumayeri District. Its population is 10,908 (2022). The mayor is Mustafa Koloğlu (MHP), elected in 2019.

References

Populated places in Düzce Province
Cumayeri District
Towns in Turkey